Drew M. Deckman is an American/Mexican chef and restaurateur.  He worked at restaurants in Europe and was recognised by the Michelin Guide for his work at the Restaurant Vitus in Reinstorf.  He then set up restaurants in Baja California –  Deckman’s en el Mogor in the Valle de Guadalupe and Deckman's at Havana in San Jose del Cabo.

References 

American chefs
American male chefs
American restaurateurs
Culture of Baja California
Head chefs of Michelin starred restaurants
Living people
People from Peachtree City, Georgia
Rhodes College alumni
Year of birth missing (living people)